Arumugam Thiagarajah (17 April 1916 – 25 May 1981) was a Sri Lankan Tamil teacher, politician and Member of Parliament.

Early life
Thiagarajah was born on 17 April 1916. He was principal of Karainagar Hindu College.

Career
Thiagarajah stood as the All Ceylon Tamil Congress's candidate in Vaddukoddai at the 1970 parliamentary election. He won the election and entered Parliament. He later defected to the governing Sri Lanka Freedom Party (SLFP) and voted for the new republican constitution. He was labelled a traitor by Tamil militants and Tamil nationalists. He was the target of an assassination attempt at his Colombo home in 1972. Thiagarajah contested the 1977 parliamentary election as an independent candidate but was resoundingly defeated by the Tamil United Liberation Front candidate T. Thirunavukarasu.

Assassination
The United National Party chose Thiagarajah to be its lead candidate in Jaffna District at the 1981 District Development Council election. Tamil militant groups had warned candidates not to contest for the UNP. He was shot by the militant People's Liberation Organisation of Tamil Eelam (PLOTE) on 24 May 1981 as he was addressing an election meeting in Moolai. He died on the next day 25 May 1981 in hospital.

References

1916 births
1981 deaths
All Ceylon Tamil Congress politicians
Assassinated Sri Lankan politicians
Members of the 7th Parliament of Ceylon
People from Northern Province, Sri Lanka
People killed by the People's Liberation Organisation of Tamil Eelam
People from British Ceylon
Sri Lanka Freedom Party politicians
Sri Lankan Tamil politicians
Sri Lankan Tamil teachers
United National Party politicians